The Makira starling (Aplonis dichroa), also known as the San Cristobal starling, is a species of starling in the family Sturnidae. It is endemic to the Solomon Islands. Its natural habitat is subtropical or tropical moist lowland forests.

References

Makira starling
Birds of Makira
Makira starling
Taxonomy articles created by Polbot